1000 Vivos is a live album by Los Pericos.  The tracks come from a 1997 concert in Buenos Aires which celebrated the band's tenth anniversary and from a 1999 concert celebrating the band's first 1000 shows.

The official presentation of the album, was held at the Obras Sanitarias Stadium, where as rarely saw the stadium, more than 6,000 people inside and another 2,000 people listening from the street.

Track listing

References 

2000 live albums
Los Pericos live albums
EMI Records live albums
Spanish-language live albums
Live albums recorded in Buenos Aires